The 2015–16 EHF Cup was the 35th edition of the EHF Cup, the second most important European handball club competition organised by the European Handball Federation (EHF), and the fourth edition since the merger with the EHF Cup Winners' Cup.

Qualification stage
The qualification stage consisted of three rounds, which were played as two-legged ties using a home-and-away system. In the draws for each round, teams were allocated into two pots, with teams from Pot 1 facing teams from Pot 2. The winners of each pairing (highlighted in bold) qualified for the following round.

For each round, teams listed first played the first leg at home. In some cases, teams agreed to play both matches at the same venue.

Round 1
A total of 24 teams entered the draw for the first qualification round, which was held on Tuesday, 22 July 2015. The first legs were played on 6–7 September and the second legs were played on 13–14 September 2015.

|}
Notes

a Both legs were hosted by Hubo Initia Hasselt.
b Both legs were hosted by RK Poreč.
c Both legs were hosted by NMC Górnik Zabrze.
d Both legs were hosted by Haslum Handballklubb.

e Both legs were hosted by KRAS/Volendam.
f Both legs were hosted by SSV Bozen Loacker.

Round 2
A total of 32 teams entered the draw for the second qualification round, which was held on Tuesday, 22 July 2015. Among these teams were 12 winners of the previous round.

|}
Notes

a Both legs were hosted by Dinamo București.
b Both legs were hosted by OIF Arendal.
c Both legs were hosted by Haukar.

Round 3
A total of 32 teams entered the draw for the third qualification round, which was held on Tuesday, 21 October 2015. Among these teams 16 winners of the previous round.

|}

Group stage

Draw and format
The draw of the EHF Cup group phase took place on Thursday, 3 December 2015, at 11:00 CET. The 16 teams allocated into four pots were drawn into four groups of four teams. The country protection rule was applied, i.e. two clubs from the same country could not face each other in the same group.

In each group, teams played against each other home-and-away in a round-robin format. The matchdays were 13–14 February, 20–21 February, 27–28 February, 5–6 March, 19–20 March, and 26–27 March 2016.

If two or more teams are equal on points on completion of the group matches, the following criteria are applied to determine the rankings (in descending order):
number of points in matches of all teams directly involved;
goal difference in matches of all teams directly involved;
higher number of plus goals in matches of all teams directly involved;
goal difference in all matches of the group;
higher number of plus goals in all matches of the group;

If no ranking can be determined, a decision shall be obtained by drawing lots. Lots shall be drawn by the EHF, if possible in the presence of a responsible of each club.

Seeding
On 3 December 2015, EHF announced the composition of the group phase seeding pots.

Group A

Group B

Group C

Group D

Ranking of the second-placed teams
The ranking of the second-placed teams was carried out on the basis of  the team's results in the group stage. Because the French side HBC Nantes, the organizers of the Final 4 tournament, finished on top of their group they qualified directly to the final tournament and only the top three second-placed teams qualified to the quarter-finals.

Knockout stage

Quarter-finals

Draw and format
Because the hosts of the Final 4 tournament, HBC Nantes, finished the group stage among the group winners, they have clinched the direct ticket to the final weekend and decided that only three quarter-finals were played for the remaining spots in the final tournament. The draw of the EHF Cup quarter-finals took place on Tuesday 29 March 2016 at the EHF headquarters in Vienna, Austria. Six teams were positioned into two pots. Teams from the same group could not face each other in the quarter-finals. The country protection rule was not applied for the quarter-finals. Therefore, there were two national duels in this round.

In the quarter-finals, teams played against each other on a home-and-away basis, with the teams from second pot playing the first leg at home. The first pot contained the three group winners and the second pot contained the top three second-placed teams.

|}

Final four

Top goalscorers

See also
2015–16 EHF Champions League
2015–16 EHF Challenge Cup

References

External links
EHF Cup (official website)

EHF Cup
EHF Cup
EHF Cup seasons